The Grand Theatre is part of a complex of historic buildings in Salem, Oregon, United States that was originally owned by the fraternal organization Independent Order of Odd Fellows, and listed on the National Register of Historic Places (NRHP) as the Chemeketa Lodge No. 1, Odd Fellows Buildings. The theater building is also known as the I.O.O.F. Temple.

The Grand Theatre was built as a lodge hall and opera house by the Oddfellows in 1900, and was designed by the architectural firm of Pugh & Gray. The Julius Grau Opera Company performed at the grand opening on November 29, 1900. An annex containing a hotel and bus terminal and designed by architect Morris Whitehouse was built in 1921. The two former I.O.O.F. buildings were added to the NRHP in 1988. The buildings currently hold retail businesses, offices, and a ballroom with other facilities that are rented for special events and even lends itself as a film and music venue.  Enlightened Theatrics also performs several Broadway style live performances each year at the Grand Theatre.  

The Grand Theatre has main floor and balcony seating.   The Film Daily Yearbook of 1947 listed the Grand Theatre having 744 seats.  Over the years,  the seating capacity has been reduced to 380 seats. There are 13 rows on the main floor with 268 seats and 5 rows in the balcony with 112 seats.

See also
Reed Opera House and McCornack Block Addition
Elsinore Theater
Capitol Theater (Salem, Oregon)

References

External links

Chemeketa Lodge No. 1, Oddfellows from Salem Online History
Grand Theater history and images from Puget Sound Theatre Organ Society
Grand Ballroom (official website of building owners)
Image of Grand Theatre building taken from Marion County Courthouse
 with detailed description and history of the buildings

Theatres in Oregon
Buildings and structures in Salem, Oregon
Odd Fellows buildings in Oregon
Culture of Salem, Oregon
National Register of Historic Places in Salem, Oregon
1900 establishments in Oregon
Theatres on the National Register of Historic Places in Oregon
Historic district contributing properties in Oregon